The Washington City Paper is a U.S. alternative weekly newspaper serving the Washington, D.C., metropolitan area. The City Paper is distributed on Thursdays; its average circulation in 2006 was 85,588. The paper's editorial mix is focused on local news and arts. Its 2018 circulation figure was 47,000.

History 
The Washington City Paper was started in 1981 by Russ Smith and Alan Hirsch, the owners of the Baltimore City Paper. For its first year it was called 1981. The name was changed to City Paper in January 1982 and in December 1982 Smith and Hirsch sold 80% of it to Chicago Reader, Inc. In 1988, Chicago Reader, Inc.  acquired the remaining 20% interest. In July 2007 both the Washington City Paper and the Chicago Reader were sold to the Tampa-based Creative Loafing chain. In 2012, Creative Loafing Atlanta and the Washington City Paper were sold to SouthComm Communications.

Amy Austin, the longtime general manager, was promoted to publisher in 2003. Michael Schaffer was named editor in April, 2010, two months after Erik Wemple resigned to run the new local startup TBD.

On December 21, 2017, it was announced that D.C.-area venture capitalist and philanthropist Mark Ein would buy the City Paper. He became the first D.C.-based owner in the paper's history. Ein announced the creation of two groups to ensure the paper's long-term success: "Alumni Group" and "Friends of Washington City Paper."

Defamation lawsuit 
In 2011, Daniel Snyder, the owner of the Washington Redskins, filed a lawsuit against the City Paper for The Cranky Redskins Fan's Guide to Dan Snyder, a November 19, 2010 cover story that portrayed him in a negative light. He and the Simon Wiesenthal Center claimed that the story used anti-Semitic tropes. Prominent sports journalists, Jewish groups, and Jewish writers published sharp criticism of Snyder and the Simon Wiesenthal Center's claims of anti-Semitism, referring in various opinion pieces and public statements to their statements as, “breathtakingly dumb allegation”, “almost unbearably stupid”, and “so self-evidently lacking in merit”.

The Washington City paper issued its own response in a published editorial, saying, "But we at City Paper take accusations of anti-Semitism seriously—in part because many of us are Jewish, including staffers who edited the story and designed the cover. So let us know, Mr. Snyder, when you want to fight the real anti-Semites."

In response, hundreds of loyal readers donated over $30,000 to a legal defense fund.

In September, 2011 the lawsuit was dropped, after, in December, 2010, Washington D.C. passed anti-SLAPP legislation ("David Donovan, the Redskins’ former chief operating officer and general counsel, that threatened an expensive legal battle unless Snyder received a retraction and an apology"), while also, Amy Austin, the publisher, had written in a February article that unauthorized switching of long-distance accounts by Snyder Communications and GTE Communications was not meant to be construed as, by Snyder himself, but people who worked for Snyder Communications and GTE Communications.

Contents

Regular City Paper features include:

 a cover feature, 2,500 to 12,000 words in length
 an arts feature, 1,200 to 2,000 words in length
 The District Line, a section of shorter news features about D.C.
 Loose Lips, a news column and blog devoted to D.C. local politics
 Young & Hungry, a food column and blog
 Housing Complex, a real estate column and blog
 Music, theater, film, gallery, and book reviews by various writers
 City Lights, a section comprising critics' events picks.

Also published is one syndicated feature:

 Savage Love, by Dan Savage

Notable former staffers

 David Carr – Former staff writer, The New York Times; author, The Night of the Gun
 Jake Tapper – Chief Washington correspondent, CNN
 Ta-Nehisi Coates – National correspondent, The Atlantic; author, Between the World and Me; MacArthur "Genius" grant recipient
 Katherine Boo – Author, Behind the Beautiful Forevers; MacArthur "Genius" grant recipient
 Erik Wemple – Media critic, The Washington Post
 Jack Shafer – Senior media writer, Politico; former columnist, Reuters; former columnist, Slate
 Amanda Hess – Staff writer, The New York Times; former staff writer, Slate
 Dave McKenna – Staff writer, Deadspin
 David Plotz – CEO, Atlas Obscura; co-host, Slate Political Gabfest; former staff writer, Slate
 Jelani Cobb – Staff writer, The New Yorker
 Clara Jeffery – Editor-in-chief, Mother Jones
 Kara Swisher – Co-founder, Recode
 Jason Cherkis – Reporter, HuffPost
 Neil Drumming – Producer, This American Life
 Amanda Ripley – Journalist and author
 Michael Schaffer – Editor, Washingtonian
 Brett Anderson – Contributing writer, The New York Times; former restaurant critic, The Times-Picayune
 Tom Scocca – Deputy executive editor, Special Projects Desk, Gizmodo Media Group
 Christina Cauterucci – Staff writer, Slate
 Lydia DePillis – Economics reporter, CNNMoney; former economics reporter, Houston Chronicle; former business reporter, The Washington Post
 Jonathan Fischer – Senior editor, Slate
 Josh Levin – Executive editor, Slate
 Jessica Sidman – Food editor, Washingtonian
 Mike DeBonis - Reporter, The Washington Post
 Alan Suderman, Virginia statehouse reporter, Associated Press
 Will Sommer - Reporter, The Daily Beast
 Shani Hilton – Deputy Managing Editor, Los Angeles Times
 Perry Stein - Reporter, The Washington Post

References

External links
 Washington City Paper
 Ink Well Crosswords

Alternative weekly newspapers published in the United States
Newspapers published in Washington, D.C.
Publications established in 1981